Abdallah Haji Shaibu (born 21 October 1998), known as Abdallah Shaibu Ninja, is a Tanzanian football player who plays as a defender for Tanzanian Premier League club Young Africans SC and the Tanzania national team.

References

External links

1998 births
Living people
Zanzibari footballers
Tanzanian footballers
Association football defenders
LA Galaxy II players
USL Championship players
Zanzibar international footballers
Tanzanian expatriate footballers
Tanzanian expatriate sportspeople in the United States
Expatriate soccer players in the United States
Tanzanian expatriate sportspeople in the Czech Republic
Expatriate footballers in the Czech Republic